WXBC may refer to

 WXBC (AM) a low power student run radio station
 WXBC (FM) a radio station in Hardinsburg, Kentucky.